Jose Karingozhackal Mani (born 29 May 1965) is an Indian politician and Member of Parliament, Rajya Sabha and former Member of Parliament, Lok Sabha from Kerala. He is the son of veteran politician K. M. Mani and the Chairman of Kerala Congress (M).

Political career
He unsuccessfully contested in the parliament election in 2004 from Muvattupuzha constituency, losing to P. C. Thomas. In 2007, he was elected as the General Secretary of Kerala Congress (Mani) party. He won the 2009 Lok Sabha election from the Kottayam constituency, by a margin of more than 70,000 votes over K. Suresh Kurup of CPI(M). He was re-elected in 2014 with a winning margin of 120,599 over Mathew T. Thomas of JD(S).

Jose was a Member of the Lok Sabha Committee on Transport, Tourism and Culture for the 15th Lok Sabha. He is the Chairman of Centre for Reform and Research, a youth empowerment society. He is also the President of Vikasana Sena, a youth association associated with Prateeksha Rotary Centre for Mentally Challenged Children.

As Chairman of Kerala Congress (M)
After the death of Kerala Congress (M) chairman K.M Mani, a power struggle erupted in the party between Jose K. Mani faction and P. J. Joseph faction. The Election Commission intervened and ruled in favor of Jose K Mani. Later, the faction led by P.J Joseph merged with Kerala Congress and faction led by Jose K Mani elected K.M Mani's son Jose K Mani as the Chairman of Kerala Congress (M).

Expulsion from UDF 
After the death of KM Mani, as per a previous agreement, UDF asked the Mani faction to give up the post of Kottayam District Panchayat presidency which they dismissed. UDF expelled Kerala Congress (M) from the alliance on June 30, 2020 citing the District Panchayat presidency dispute. Later, Jose K. Mani and his party Kerala Congress (M), joined the Left Democratic Front (Kerala) in October 2020.

With Left Democratic Front (2020-Present) 
Kerala Congress (M) joined hands with the LDF for the 2020 Kerala local elections held in December and also for the 2021 Kerala Legislative Assembly election. It is alleged that KEC(M) allowed a CPI(M) party member to contest as a KEC(M) candidate in the Piravom (State Assembly constituency). During the 2021 Kerala Legislative Assembly election, Jose K. Mani was defeated from Pala constituency for more than 15,000 votes to the UDF candidate Mani C. Kappan.

Personal life
Jose K. Mani was born in a Syrian Catholic family to K. M. Mani and Kuttiyama on 29 May 1965 in Pala, Kerala. Jose did his schooling at St. Thomas Primary School, Pala and Montfort School, Yercaud, where South Indian actor Vikram was his classmate. He attended Loyola College, Chennai for his undergraduate degree in B.Com and then graduated with a M.B.A from PSG College of Arts and Science, Coimbatore. Jose K. Mani is married to Nisha Jose from 1994. They have two daughters and one son: Priyanka, Ritika and K.M. Mani Junior.

References

External links
Official Website

|-

India MPs 2009–2014
Malayali politicians
Kerala politicians
Syro-Malabar Catholics
Politicians from Kottayam
Living people
Lok Sabha members from Kerala
India MPs 2014–2019
1965 births
Indian National Congress politicians from Kerala
Kerala Congress (M) politicians
Government Law College, Thiruvananthapuram alumni